Tom Veelers (born 14 September 1984) is a retired Dutch professional road bicycle racer, who rode professionally between 2003 and 2016 for Löwik–Tegeltoko, the  and . Born in Ootmarsum, Overijssel, Veelers won the 2006 edition of U23 Paris–Roubaix.

In December 2016 he announced his retirement after suffering from knee injuries for over two years.

Major results

2002
 1st  Road race, National Junior Road Championships
 4th Road race, UCI Junior Road World Championships
2003
 10th Kattekoers
2004
 1st Noord-Nederland Tour (with 21 other riders)
 2nd Road race, UEC European Under-23 Road Championships
 3rd Road race, National Under-23 Road Championships
 3rd ZLM Tour
 4th Grand Prix de Waregem
2005
 3rd Ronde van Drenthe
 4th Internationale Wielertrofee Jong Maar Moedig
 5th Overall Le Triptyque des Monts et Châteaux
 5th Grand Prix Pino Cerami
 6th Overall Tour du Loir-et-Cher
1st Stage 5
 7th Grand Prix de Waregem
 9th Paris–Roubaix Espoirs
2006
 1st  Overall Olympia's Tour
1st Stages 5, 6 & 8
 1st Paris–Roubaix Espoirs
 2nd Beverbeek Classic
 8th Grande Prémio Internacional Costa Azul
 10th Road race, UEC European Under-23 Road Championships
2007
 1st Overall OZ Wielerweekend
 3rd Overall Olympia's Tour
 4th Overall Boucles de la Mayenne
1st Prologue
 5th Ronde van Noord-Holland
 8th Omloop der Kempen
 8th Grand Prix de la Somme
2008
 1st Stage 7 Tour of Qinghai Lake
 3rd Ronde van Overijssel
 3rd Nationale Sluitingsprijs
 8th Ronde van het Groene Hart
2009
 1st Stage 9 Tour of Qinghai Lake
 5th Paris–Brussels
 6th Profronde van Fryslan
 10th Overall Tour of Qatar
2010
 3rd Kampioenschap van Vlaanderen
 7th Paris–Brussels
 8th Dwars door Vlaanderen
 9th Omloop Het Nieuwsblad
 9th Ronde van Overijssel
 10th Binche–Tournai–Binche
2011
 1st Stage 3 Tour of Hainan
 2nd Overall Tour de Wallonie-Picarde
1st Stage 3
 7th Overall Delta Tour Zeeland
2012
 3rd Halle–Ingooigem
 4th Overall World Ports Classic
 4th Velothon Berlin
 4th Dutch Food Valley Classic
 5th Overall Tour of Qatar
 6th Kuurne–Brussels–Kuurne
 9th Vattenfall Cyclassics
2013
 2nd Münsterland Giro
 4th Handzame Classic
 6th Dutch Food Valley Classic
 6th Grand Prix de Fourmies
 8th GP Impanis-Van Petegem

References

External links 

Profile at Argos-Shimano official website 

1984 births
Living people
People from Ootmarsum
Dutch male cyclists
Cyclists from Overijssel
20th-century Dutch people
21st-century Dutch people